Phillimon Ayesu (born 21 July 1958) is a Malawian boxer. He competed in the men's light welterweight event at the 1984 Summer Olympics.

References

1958 births
Living people
Malawian male boxers
Olympic boxers of Malawi
Boxers at the 1984 Summer Olympics
Place of birth missing (living people)
Light-welterweight boxers